The Arena Football League 10th Anniversary Team was compiled in 1996 to show the league's best players in its brief 10-year history.

References

Arena Football League trophies and awards